Columbus University may refer to:
Columbus University (Panama) a university in Panama
Columbus State University in the U.S. state of Georgia
Columbus University (Washington, D.C.) established by the Knights of Columbus and later merged into Catholic University of America
Ohio State University in Columbus, Ohio
The fictional school depicted in the film Higher Learning
Columbus University (Louisiana), an unaccredited institution of higher learning in Louisiana